Lalmati is a locality in southern part of Guwahati surrounded by Jalukbari Lokhra and Basistha localities. It is near National Highway 37.

See also
 Pan Bazaar
 Paltan Bazaar
 Beltola

Neighbourhoods in Guwahati